"Did You Wrong" is a song by American R&B singer Pleasure P. It is his debut single from his first studio album The Introduction of Marcus Cooper. It is his first solo release after his departure from Pretty Ricky. The song was produced by R. Zamor and was released in June 2008.

Remixes
"Did You Wrong" (Remix) (featuring Teairra Marí) (Official Remix) 
"Did You Wrong" (C-hansen Remix) (featuring Chris Hansen)

Charts

Weekly charts

Year-end charts

References

2008 debut singles
Pleasure P songs
2008 songs
Atlantic Records singles